Greyhound racing is an organized, competitive sport in which greyhounds are raced around a track. There are two forms of greyhound racing, track racing (normally around an oval track) and coursing; the latter is now banned in most countries. Track racing uses an artificial lure (usually a form of windsock) that travels ahead of the greyhounds on a rail until the greyhounds cross the finish line. As with horse racing, greyhound races often allow the public to bet on the outcome.

In many countries, greyhound racing is purely amateur and solely for enjoyment. In other countries, particularly Australia, Ireland, the United Kingdom and the United States greyhound racing is similar to horse racing in that it is part of the gambling industry.

Animal rights and animal welfare groups have been critical of the welfare of greyhounds in the commercial racing industry for many years which has contributed to the reforms of the industries in recent years. A greyhound adoption movement spearheaded by kennel owners has arisen to assist retired racing dogs in finding homes as pets, with an estimated adoption rate of over 95% in the United States.

History

Modern greyhound racing has its origins in coursing. The first recorded attempt at racing greyhounds on a straight track was made beside the Welsh Harp reservoir, Hendon, England, in 1876, but this experiment did not develop. The industry emerged in its recognizable modern form, featuring circular or oval tracks, with the invention of the mechanical, or artificial, hare in 1912 by an American, Owen Patrick Smith. O.P. Smith had altruistic aims for the industry to stop the killing of the jack rabbits and see "greyhound racing as we see horse racing". In 1919, Smith opened the first professional dog-racing track with stands in Emeryville, California.  The Emeryville arena was torn down in February 1920 to make way for the construction of a modern racetrack using the mechanical lure, described in the press as the "automatic rabbit."  The first race at the new park was on Saturday, May 29, 1920.

The certificates system led the way to parimutuel betting, as quarry and on-course gambling, in the United States during the 1930s.

The oval track and mechanical hare were introduced to Britain, in 1926, by another American, Charles Munn, in association with Major Lyne-Dixson, a Canadian, who was a key figure in coursing. Finding other supporters proved rather difficult, however, and with the General Strike of 1926 looming, the two men scoured the country in an attempt to find others who would join them. Eventually they met Brigadier-General Critchley, who introduced them to Sir William Gentle. Between them they raised £22,000, and like the American 'International Greyhound Racing Association' (or the I.G.R.A.), they launched the Greyhound Racing Association holding the first British meeting at Manchester's Belle Vue Stadium. The industry was successful in cities and towns throughout the UK – by the end of 1927, there were forty tracks operating.

Middle-class reformers were outraged, and the working-class delighted, with the emergence in the late-1920s of Greyhound racing as an entertaining new sport and betting opportunity.  At first it seemed modern, glamorous, and American, but the middle class lost interest when working-class audiences took over. The working class appreciated the nearby urban locations of the tracks and the evening times of the meetings. Betting has always been a key ingredient of greyhound racing, both through on-course bookmakers and the totalisator, first introduced in 1930. Like horse racing, it is popular to bet on the greyhound races as a form of parimutuel betting.

Greyhound racing enjoyed its highest United Kingdom attendances just after the Second World War—for example, attendances during 1946 were estimated to be around 75 million based on an annual totalisator turnover of £196,431,430. The industry experienced a decline beginning in the early 1960s, after the 1960 UK Betting and Gaming Act permitted off-course cash betting. Sponsorship, limited television coverage, and the later abolition of on-course betting tax have partially offset this decline.

Today

Commercial greyhound racing is characterized by several criteria (varying depending on country) and can include legalized gambling, the existence of a regulatory structure, the physical presence of racetracks, whether the host state or subdivision shares in any gambling proceeds, fees charged by host locations, the use of professional racing kennels, the number of dogs participating in races, the existence of an official racing code, and membership in a greyhound racing federation or trade association.

In addition to the seven countries where commercial greyhound racing exists, in at least twenty-one countries dog racing occurs, but has not yet reached a commercial stage.

Medical care
The medical care of a racing greyhound is primarily the responsibility of the trainer while in training. All tracks in the United Kingdom have to have a veterinary surgeon and veterinary room facilities on site during racing. The greyhounds require microchipping, annual vaccinations against distemper, infectious canine hepatitis, parvovirus, leptospirosis,  and a vaccination to minimize outbreaks of diseases such as kennel cough. All greyhounds in the UK must pass a pre-race veterinary inspection before being allowed to take part in that race.

The racing industry (in several countries) actively works to prevent the spread of doping cases. Attempts are being made to recover urine samples from all greyhounds in a race, not just the winners. Greyhounds from which samples cannot be obtained for a certain number of consecutive races are subject to being ruled off the track in some countries. Violators are subject to criminal penalties and loss of their racing licenses by state gaming commissions and a permanent ban from the National Greyhound Association. The trainer of the greyhound is at all times the "absolute insurer" of the condition of the animal. The trainer is responsible for any positive test regardless of how the banned substance has entered the greyhound's system.

Retirement
Generally, a greyhound's career will end between the ages of four and six – after the dog can no longer race, or possibly when it is no longer competitive. The best dogs are kept for breeding and there are industry-associated adoption groups and rescue groups that work to obtain retired racing greyhounds and place them as pets. In the United Kingdom, the Greyhound Board of Great Britain (GBGB) has introduced measures to locate where racing greyhounds reside after they have retired from racing and as from 2017 records have been available to the public.

Several organizations, such as British Greyhounds Retired Database, Greyhound Rescue West of England, Birmingham Greyhound Protection, GAGAH, Adopt-a-Greyhound and Greyhound Pets of America, and the Greyhound Trust try to ensure that as many of the dogs as possible are adopted. Some of these groups also advocate better treatment of the dogs while at the track and/or the end of racing for profit. In recent years the racing industry has made significant progress in establishing programs for the adoption of retired racers. In addition to actively cooperating with private adoption groups throughout the country, many race tracks have established their own adoption programs at various tracks.

By country

Australia

Greyhounds Australasia was formed in 1937 (as the Australian and New Zealand Greyhound Association) and consists of governing bodies in Australian states and New Zealand, which regulate greyhound welfare and living conditions.

Ireland

Greyhound racing is a popular industry in Ireland with the majority of tracks falling under the control of Rásaíocht Con Éireann (GRI) which is a commercial semi-state body and reports to the Department of Agriculture, Food and the Marine. The vast majority of greyhounds racing in the UK are imported from Irish breeders (estimated 90%). 
In the greyhound industry Northern Irish tracks are considered to be in the category of Irish greyhound racing and the results are published by the IGB. They do not come under the control of the Greyhound Board of Great Britain.

New Zealand

Racing in New Zealand is governed by the New Zealand Racing Board (NZRB) in accordance with the Racing Act 2003.

United Kingdom

Greyhound racing in Great Britain is regulated by the Greyhound Board of Great Britain and accredited by United Kingdom Accreditation Service.

United States

In the United States, greyhound racing is governed by state or local law. Greyhound care is regulated by the National Association of State Racing Commissions and the American Greyhound Council (AGC). The AGC is jointly run by the National Greyhound Association.

Other countries
There is one greyhound racing track in Mexico, the Caliente Greyhound Track in Tijuana, as well as one greyhound racing track in Vietnam at the Lam Son Stadium in Vung Tau, Vietnam. Additionally, there was one greyhound track in Macau, China at the Canidrome which conducted greyhound racing for about 90 years, but discontinued in 2018.

See also
Coursing
Greyhound jockey

References

 
Animal racing